The Slovakian Women's National Volleyball Cup is the Official women's volleyball cup competition in Slovakia, First edition started in 1993 under the rule of the Slovak Volleyball Federation (SVF), The competition formule is a playoffs home and away combined score.

Competition history

Winners list

Honours By Club

References

External links
   Slovak Volleyball Federation  

Volleyball in Slovakia